John de Brus (died 1275), was an English knight. He was a younger son of Robert de Brus, 5th Lord of Annandale and Isabella de Clare.

He is said to be the ancestor of Thomas de Bruys of Clackmannan, whose descendants became the Earls of Elgin, Kincardine and Ailesbury.

Citations

Year of birth unknown
1275 deaths
13th-century English  people